Asher Tlalim (aka: Asher de Bentolila Tlalim, 30 March 1950 – 21 October 2022) was an Israeli filmmaker, born in Tangier (then an international city, now part of Morocco), who grew up in Spain and since the beginning of the millennium was based in London. Tlalim was mostly known for his 1989-90 trilogy Kol ha’Anashim Ha’bodedim (All the Lonely People, recipient of the 1990 Wolgin Prize, Jerusalem Film Festival); for his 1994 film Don’t Touch My Holocaust (recipient of the Israeli Academy Award prize, currently named Ophir Award); his critically acclaimed film Galoot, exile in Hebrew as well as his children's videos, Dig-dig-dug 1, 2 & 3 and others.

Tlalim's films have been shown in the Berlin Film Festival, Jerusalem Film Festival, Montreal Film Festival, Hamptons Film Festival, Chicago Film Festival, Sheffield Doc/Fest, and many others.  Tlalim's work has received scholarly attention by academics such as Omer Bartov and others.

Tlalim lived in London and taught at the National Film and Television School (NFTS).

Biography
Asher Tlalim was born in Tangier in 1950 under the name of Mesod Bentolila to Ester and Jacob Bentolila. From Tangier, the family moved to Malaga, Spain. The family came to Israel in 1960 and settled in B’nei Brak, where he studied in a religious high-school. In 1968 Tlalim was drafted to the Golani Brigade of the army. He was stationed in the Sinai during the War of Attrition (1967-70) and later also took part in the  Yom Kippur War (1973). Experiences from these wars served as the basis for his first films.

Tlalim lived in Jerusalem for many years. In 1998 he moved to London with his second wife, Ronit. He taught at the National Film and Television School (NFTS) whilst continuing to direct and produce films in the UK and Israel.

Personal life and death
Tlalim married his first wife Miri (née: Phillip) in 1975. They have two children: Tom Carlos and Annael. In 1993 Tlalim married his second wife, Ronit Yoeli-Tlalim and had two more children: Avigail and Jonathan. Tom Carlos is named after his uncle Carlos Bentolila Asher's younger brother, who was killed in 1973 in the Yom Kippur War. Tom Tlalim is an artist, musician and scholar. Anael Zimmerman (née Tlalim) is a speech therapist. Avigail Tlalim is an actor and theatre director.

Tlalim died from cancer in London, on 21 October 2022, at the age of 72.

Filmography

As director
 2021 – Make Me A King (Short Fiction) (associate producer) (pre-production)
 2021 – Hold My Hand (Short Fiction) (associate producer) (post-production)
 2020 – Woman of Valour (Short Fiction) (associate producer) (post-production)
 2020 – The Schnoz (Short Fiction) (associate producer)
 2019 – On the Beaches (Short Fiction) (associate producer)
 2019 – Home (Short Animation) (associate producer)
 2019 – Starboy (Short Fiction) (associate producer)
 2017 – The Master of York (Short Fiction) (associate producer)
 2017 – The Outer Circle (Short Fiction) (associate producer)
 2016 – Mordechai (Short Fiction) (associate producer)
 2015 – The Chop (Short Fiction) (associate producer)
 2015 – The Guitar (Short Fiction) (associate producer)
 2015 – samuel-613 (Short Fiction) (associate producer) Nominated for BAFTA
 2012 – Hannah Cohen Holy's Communion (Short Fiction)(associate producer) 
 2010 – WITHOUT A HOME,     documentary 100min (screenwriter, director & editor)
 2003 – GALOOT (Exile In Hebrew) documentary 100min (screenwriter, director,     editor & co-producer)
 1999 – MY YIDDISHE MAMA’S DREAM documentary (screenwriter, director &     editor)
 1999 – SOUNDS IN SEARCH OF A HOME documentary 60min (screenwriter, director & editor)
 1998 – HITCHHIKERS fiction 60min (director & editor)
 1998 – SHALOM HAVER documentary 60min (screenwriter, director & editor)
 1998 – BETWEEN THE CAROB AND THE OLIVE TREE doc 60min (screenwriter, director & editor)
 1994 – DON’T TOUCH MY HOLOCAUST Al Tigu Le B'Shoah 150min documentary (Screenwriter, director & editor)
 1994 – YATZEK BE HIRIYA fiction (Short; screenwriter, director & editor)
 1994 – YOM EHAD HALEV NIFTAH, 60min documentary (screenwriter, director & editor)
 1993 – HAKIVUN YERUSALAYIM, 60min documentary (screenwriter, director & editor)
 1992–1993 – A PEOPLE AND ITS MUSIC: THE JEWISH MUSIC HERITAGE LIBRARY (10 chapter series; screenwriter, director & editor) 
 1991 – TIME OF THE CAMEL, 100min fiction (screenwriter, director, editor & co- producer)
 1989–1990 – ALL THE LONELY PEOPLE, 150 min documentary (screenwriter, director  & editor), a trilogy about immigration, rock and maturing: FRIENDS     WITHOUT FRIENDS, with ‘Natasha’s Friends’; TRANSPARENT, with     Albert Amar and CLOSE BY, with Ehud Banay
 1988 – THE MISSING PICTURE,     30min documentary (screenwriter, director  & editor)
 1987 – THE BATTLE OVER THE     HERMON, 60min documentary  (screenwriter, director & editor)
 1986 – THE LAST NOMAD,     (screenwriter, director & editor)
 1984 – A DAY IN A DIARY     (screenwriter, director & editor)
 1982–1983 – ENCOUNTER IN THE     DESERT, fiction, 240 min  (screenwriter, director & editor)
 1981 – HOLOCAUST AND     REVOLT, 60 min documentary (director &  editor)
 1980 – EMEK HABAHA / THE     VALLEY OF TEARS, 50 min doc (screenwriter,  co-director & editor)
 1978 – JERUSALEM 24/4/74,     60min fiction (producer, screenwriter, director & editor)
 1977 – THE LAST OF THE     MOHICANS, 17min documentary  (screenwriter, director & editor)
 1977 – IT’S ALL MY FUN,     17min fiction (screenwriter, director & editor)

Children DVDs
 1997 – EPHROHIM, 45min fiction/musical     (Screenwriter, director & editor)
 1996 – HOLCHIM LAGAN, 50min fiction/musical (Screenwriter, director & editor)
 1995 – BA LI MESIBA LI,     50min fiction/musical (Screenwriter, director & editor)
 1995 – YELEDISH IN THE     CIRCUS, 60min, fiction (Screenwriter, director & editor)
 1994 – A SMALL WORLD,     50min fiction/musical
 1994 – YELEDISH, 50min     fiction/musical (screenwriter, director & editor)
 1993 – DIG DIG DUG 3,     60min fiction/musical (screenwriter, director & editor)
 1992 – OD DIG DIG DUG,     60min, (screenwriter, director & editor)
 1992 – DIG DIG DUG,     60min, (screenwriter, director & editor)

References

External links
 Living with the Bedouin - BBC World The Arts Hour

1950 births
2022 deaths
Israeli documentary filmmakers
Israeli filmmakers
Israeli film producers
Israeli film editors
Tel Aviv University alumni
Moroccan emigrants to Israel
Israeli emigrants to the United Kingdom
Israeli people of Moroccan-Jewish descent
People from Tangier